Móric Jókay de Ásva (known as Mór Jókai; 18 February 1825 – 5 May 1904), outside Hungary also known as Maurus Jokai or Mauritius Jókai, was a Hungarian nobleman, novelist, dramatist and revolutionary. He was an active participant and a leading personality in the outbreak of Hungarian Liberal Revolution of 1848 in Pest. Jókai's romantic novels became very popular among the elite of Victorian-era England; he was often compared to Dickens in the 19th-century British press. One of his most famous fans and admirers was Queen Victoria herself.

Early life
He was born in Komárom, in the Kingdom of Hungary (present-day Komárno in Slovakia). His father, József Jókai de Ásva (1781–1837), was a member of the Ásva branch of the ancient Jókay noble family; his mother was noblewoman Mária Pulay (1790–1856). As a boy, he was timid and delicate, and was therefore educated at home until the age of ten, at which time he was sent to Pozsony (today: Bratislava in Slovakia). He then completed his education at the Calvinist college at Pápa, where he first met Sándor Petőfi, Sándor Kozma and several other young men who subsequently became famous.

After his father's death when Jókai was 12, his family intended for him to pursue a career in law like his father. The young Jókai, always singularly assiduous, plodded conscientiously through the usual curriculum at Kecskemét and Pest (part of what is now Budapest), and succeeded in winning his first case as a full-fledged lawyer.

Career
The drudgery of a lawyer's office was uncongenial to the ardently poetical Jókai. Encouraged by the encomia pronounced by the Hungarian Academy on his first play, Zsidó fiú (The Jewish Boy), he moved to Pest in 1845 with a manuscript novel in his pocket. Hétköznapok was instantly recognized by all the leading critics as a work of original genius, and in the following year Jókai was appointed the editor of Életképek, then the leading Hungarian literary journal, and gathered round himself a circle of young Hungarian writers.

He married the great tragic actress, Róza Laborfalvi, on 29 August 1848. On the outbreak of the revolution of 1848, the young editor enthusiastically adopted the nationalist cause. He was a moderate Liberal, opposed to all excesses; but, swayed by the nationalist victories of April and May 1849, he supported Kossuth's decision to depose the Habsburg dynasty. He was present at the surrender at Világos (now Şiria, Romania) in August, 1849. He intended to commit suicide to avoid imprisonment, but was spared by the arrival of his wife, with whom he made a difficult journey on foot through Russian lines to Pest.

For the next fourteen years, Jokai lived the life of a political suspect. During this time he devoted himself to the rehabilitation of the Magyar language, composing in it no fewer than thirty novels, besides innumerable volumes of tales, essays, criticism and faceti. This was the period of such masterpieces as Erdély aranykora (The Golden Age of Transylvania), with its sequel Török világ Magyarországon (The Turks in Hungary), Egy magyar nábob (A Hungarian Nabob), with its sequel Kárpáthy Zoltán, Janicsárok végnapjai (The Last Days of the Janissaries), and Szomorú napok (Sad Days).

On the re-establishment of the Hungarian constitution by the Austro-Hungarian Compromise of 1867, Jókai took an active part in politics. As a constant supporter of the Tisza administration, not only in parliament, where he sat continuously for more than twenty years, but also as the editor of the government organ, Hon, founded by him in 1863, he became a power in the state, and, though he never took office himself, frequently extricated the government from difficult places. In 1897 the king appointed him a member of the upper house. In 1899, he created a country-wide scandal by contracting a marriage with Bella Nagy, a young actress.

Jókai died in Budapest on 5 May 1904, his first wife having died on 20 November 1886. Both were buried at the Kerepesi Cemetery.

Writings
Jókai was extremely prolific. He devoted most of his time to literature, and his productiveness after 1870 was stupendous, amounting to some hundreds of volumes. Among the finest of his later works may be mentioned Az arany ember (A Man of Gold, translated into English, among others, under the title The Man with the Golden Touch), the most popular A kőszívű ember fiai (The Heartless Man's Sons), the heroic chronicle of the Hungarian Revolution of 1848, and A tengerszemű hölgy (Eyes like the Sea), the latter of which won the Academy's prize in 1890. He was also an amateur chess player (see: Mór Jókai Museum in Balatonfüred).

His Jövő század regénye (The novel of the next century - 1872) is accounted an important early work of science fiction though the term did not yet exist at the time (see). In spite of its romantic trappings, this monumental two-volume novel includes some acute observations and almost prophetic visions, such as the prediction of a revolution in Russia and the establishment of a totalitarian state there, or the arrival of aviation. Because it could be read as a satirical allegory on Leninism and Stalinism in the Soviet Union, the book was banned in Hungary in the decades of the Stalinist Era. (Its "Critical Edition" was delayed until 1981.)

Collected editions
The greatest collections of his works:
 Összes művei. Nemzeti (Jubileumi) Kiadás. (Complete Works, "National Edition") 1894-1898, 100 vols.
 Hátrahagyott művei. (Late and Uncollected Works; the Sequel of the "National Edition") 1912, 10 vols.
 Összes művei. Centenáriumi kiadás. (Complete Works, "Centenary Edition") 1925-1932, 100 vols.
 Összes művei. Kritikai kiadás. (Complete Works, "Critical Edition") 1962-, in advance.

Works

 "Hétköznapok" (Weekdays), 1846
 "Vadon virágai" (Flowers of the Wild) 1848 - short stories
 "Forradalmi és csataképek" (Pictures of Revolution and Fight), 1850 (in English: Hungarian Sketches in Peace and War - a selection by Imre Szabad, 1854) (**)
 "Erdély aranykora" (The Golden Age of Transylvania), 1852 (in English: Midst the Wild Carpathians - translated by R. Nisbet Bain, 1894) (**)
 "Török világ Magyarországon" (Turkish World in Hungary), 1852 (in English: The Slaves of the Padishah - translated by R. Nisbet Bain, 1902) (**)
 "A kalózkirály" (The King of the Pirates), 1852-53 (in English: The Corsair King - translated by Mary J. Safford, 1901) (***)
 "Egy magyar nábob" (A Hungarian Nabob), 1853 (in English: An Hungarian Nabob - translated by R. Nisbet Bain, 1898) (**)
 "A fehér rózsa" (The White Rose), 1854 (in English: Halil the Pedlar - translated by R. Nisbet Bain, 1901) (**) (film: 1919)
 "Janicsárok végnapjai" (The Last Days of the Janissaries), 1854 (in English: The Lion of Janina - translated by R. Nisbet Bain, 1897) (**)
 "Kárpáthy Zoltán" (Zoltán Kárpáthy), 1854 (film: 1966)
 "Szomorú napok" (Sad Days), 1848-56 (in English: The Day of Wrath - translated by R. Nisbet Bain, 1900) (**)
 "A régi jó táblabírák" (The Good Old Justices), 1856
 "Az elátkozott család" (The Doomed Family or The Cursed Family), 1858
 "Szegény gazdagok" (Poor Rich), 1860 (in English: Poor Plutocrats - translated by R. Nisbet Bain, 1899) (**)
 "Politikai divatok" (Political Fashions), 1862
 "Az új földesúr" (The New Squire), 1863 (in English: The New Landlord - Translated by Arthur J. Patterson, 1868) (**)
 "Felfordult világ" (An Upturned World), 1863
 "Mire megvénülünk" (By the Time We Grow Old), 1865 (in English: Debts of Honor  - translated by Arthur B. Yolland, 1900)
 "Szerelem bolondjai" (Maniacs of Love), 1868
 "A kőszívű ember fiai" (The Heartless Man's Sons), 1869 (in English: The Baron's Sons - translated by Percy Favor Bicknell, 1900) (**)
 "Fekete gyémántok" (Black Diamonds), 1870 (in English: Black Diamonds - translated by Frances Gerard [Geraldine Fitzgerald], 1896) (**)
 "Eppur si muove - És mégis mozog a Föld" (And Yet It Moves), 1872
 "Az arany ember" (The Golden Man), 1872 (films: , 1936, 1962, 2005)
English translations published: Timar’s Two Worlds - translated by Mrs Hegan Kennard, USA, 1888; Modern Midas; The Man with the Golden Touch
 "A jövő század regénye" (The Novel of the Next Century), 1872-74 (A Novel of the Coming Century) *
 "Enyim, tied, övé" (It's Mine, It's Yours, It's His), 1875
 "Egész az északi pólusig!" (Up to the North Pole!), 1875
 "Az élet komédiásai" (Comedians of the Life), 1876
 "Egy az Isten" (God is One), 1876 (in English: Manasseh. A Romance of Transylvania - translated by Percy Favor Bicknell, 1901) (**)
 "Névtelen vár" (Nameless Castle), 1877 (in English: The Nameless Castle - translated by Sarah Elisabeth Boggs, 1898) (**)
 "Szép Mikhál" (Pretty Mikhál), 1877 (in English: Pretty Michal - translated by R. Nisbet Bain, 1891) (**)
 "Görögtűz" (Greek Fire), 1877
 "Rab Ráby" (Ráby the Prisoner), 1879 (in English: The Strange Story of Ráby - anonymous, 1909) (**)
 "Egy hírhedett kalandor a 17. századból" (An Infamous Scoundrel from the 17th Century), 1879 (in English: Told by the Death's Head - translated by Sarah Elisabeth Boggs, 1903) (**)
 "Szabadság a hó alatt vagy a Zöld könyv" (Freedom under the Snow; or, The Green Book), 1879 (in English: The Green Book - translated by Mrs. Waugh [Ellis Wright], 1897) (**)
 "Páter Péter" (Friar Péter), 1881 (in English: Peter the Priest - translated by S. L. Waite & A. L. Waite, 1897) (***)
 "Akik kétszer halnak meg" (Those Who Will Die Two Times), 1881-2
 "Szeretve mind a vérpadig" (Loved up until the Scaffold), 1882
 "Egy játékos, aki nyer" (A Player Who Wins), 1882
 "Bálványosvár" (The Castle of the Idols), 1883
 "Minden poklokon keresztül" (Through All the Hells), 1883
 "A lőcsei fehér asszony" (The White Woman from Lőcse), 1884
 "A cigánybáró" (The Gipsy Baron), 1885 (adapted into the operetta The Gypsy Baron)
 "Életemből" (From my Life), 1886
 "A kiskirályok" (The Viceroys), 1886
 "A három márvány fej" (The Three Marble Heads), 1887
 "A lélekidomár" (The Trainer of the Souls), 1888-9
 "Gróf Benyovszky Móricz életrajza", (The Biography of Count Móricz Benyovszky) 1888–1891
 "A tengerszemű hölgy" (The Lady with the Eyes like the Sea), 1890 (in English: Eyes Like the Sea - translated by R. Nisbet Bain, 1893) (**)
 "Gazdag szegények" (Rich Poor), 1890
 "Nincsen ördög" (The Devil does not Exist), 1891 (in English: Dr. Dumány's Wife - translated by Frances Steinitz, 1891) (**)
 "Rákóczy fia" (Rákóczy's Son), 1891
 "A fekete vér" (The Black Blood), 1892
 "A két Trenk - Trenk Frigyes" (The Two Trenks - Friedrich Trenk), 1892-3
 "Fráter György" (Brother George), 1893
 "Sárga rózsa" (Yellow Rose), 1893 (in English: The Yellow Rose - translated by Beatrice Danford, 1909) (**)
 "De kár megvénülni!" (What a Pity to Grow Old!), 1896
 "Öreg ember nem vén ember" (An Old Man is not a Tottery Man), 1899
 "Egetvívó asszonyszív" (A Woman's Heart Wins the Heaven) 1902
 "A mi lengyelünk" (Our Man from Poland), 1903
 "Ahol a pénz nem isten" (The Place Where Money is not a God), 1904
 "Párbaj Istennel" (A duel with God)

Other English Editions (**):

 "Life in a Cave" - a short novel for children, translated by Linda Villari, 1884
 "In Love with the Czarina" - short stories, translated by Lewis Felberman, 1893
 "The Tower of Dago" - a short novel, anonymous, 1899
 "A Christian but a Roman" - a short novel, anonymous, 1900
 "Tales from Jókai" - selected and translated by R. Nisbet Bain, 1904
Source (*): http://www.globusz.com/ebooks/HunShort/00000012.htm

Source (**): Lóránt Czigány: A magyar irodalom fogadtatása a viktoriánus Angliában 1830-1914 (Budapest, Akadémiai, 1976) 

Source (***): http://www.gutenberg.org

Selected filmography
, directed by Travers Vale (1915, based on the novel Egy magyar nábob)
, directed by Alexander Korda (1918, based on the novel The Man with the Golden Touch)
White Rose, directed by Alexander Korda (1919, based on the novel A fehér rózsa)
The Gypsy Baron, directed by Frederic Zelnik (1927, based on the operetta The Gypsy Baron)
The Gypsy Baron, directed by Karl Hartl (1935, based on the operetta The Gypsy Baron)
Az aranyember, directed by Béla Gaál (1936, based on the novel The Man with the Golden Touch)
The Gypsy Baron, directed by Arthur Maria Rabenalt (1954, based on the operetta The Gypsy Baron)
The Man of Gold, directed by Viktor Gertler (1962, based on the novel The Man with the Golden Touch)
, directed by Zoltán Várkonyi (1965, based on the novel A kőszívű ember fiai)
, directed by Zoltán Várkonyi (1966, based on the novel Egy magyar nábob)
Zoltán Kárpáthy, directed by Zoltán Várkonyi (1966, based on the novel Zoltán Kárpáthy)
Szaffi, directed by Attila Dargay (1984, based on the novel The Gypsy Baron)

Honors
Three stamps were issued by Hungary in his honor, all on 1 February 1925.

References

Citations

Sources 

 Névy László, Jókai Mór
 Hegedűs Sándor, Jókai Mórról
 H. W. Temperley, "Maurus Jokai and the Historical Novel", Contemporary Review (July 1904).

External links 

 Works by Mór Jókai at Hungarian Electronic Library
 
 
 Maurus Jókai’s novels in English translation (in Hungarian but with an abstract in English at the end) by Judit Kádár (in Irodalomtörténeti Közlemények "Bulletins in Literary History")
 
 
 Mór Jókai's works: text, concordances and frequency lists
 

1825 births
1904 deaths
People from Komárno
Hungarian Calvinist and Reformed Christians
Hungarian male novelists
Burials at Kerepesi Cemetery
19th-century Hungarian novelists
19th-century Hungarian male writers
19th-century Hungarian dramatists and playwrights
Hungarian male dramatists and playwrights
Left Centre politicians